Malaya Suyetka is a rural locality (a settlement) in Krasnoshchyokovsky Selsoviet, Krasnoshchyokovsky District, Altai Krai, Russia. The population was 109 as of 2013.

Geography 
Malaya Suyetka is located 11 km southeast of Krasnoshchyokovo (the district's administrative centre) by road. Maralikha is the nearest rural locality.

References 

Rural localities in Krasnoshchyokovsky District